The USASA National Women's Amateur is an American women's soccer tournament run by the United States Adult Soccer Association.  It began in 1980 and was the top-level national tournament for women's soccer in the United States until the formation of the Women's Open in 1996.

While USASA always accepted applications for the Amateur, the competition was not held at the annual national finals weekend from 2009-2012.

The following is a list of Women's Amateur champions.

Pre-Open Era
1980: Seattle Sharks (WA)
1981: Romiosa F.C. (WA)
1982: F.C. Lowenbrau (WA)
1983: Michelob Ladies (TX)
1984: Chapel Hill Kix (NC)
1985: Michelob Ladies (TX)
1986: Fairfax Wildfire (VA)
1987: Michelob Ladies (TX)
1988: California Tremors (CA)
1989: Michelob Ladies (TX)
1990: Opus County S.C. (MA)
1991: Texas Challenge (TX)
1992: Ajax America
1993: Ajax America
1994: Sacramento Storm
1995: Sacramento Storm
Open Era
1996: Soccer Academy United (VA)
1997: Soccer Academy United (VA)
1998: Soccer Academy United (VA)
1999: Colorado Rush
2000: Real Colorado Cougars
2001: J.B. Marine S.C.
2002: St. Paul Blackhawks (MN)
2003: Hibernian Saints
2004: Chicago Eclipse Select
2005: Chicago Eclipse Select
2006: Chicago Eclipse Select
2007: New York Athletic Club
2008: Turbo D'Feeters
2009-2012: Not Held
2013: ASA Chesapeake Charge
2014: Olympic Club

References

External links
 USASA home page

  

Women's soccer cup competitions in the United States
USASA National Women's Amateur